Patrick O'Hely (born between 1543 - 1546, died 31 August, 1579) was an Irish Roman Catholic bishop of Mayo, Ireland, who was executed by the English secular authorities.

Biography
Born in Dromahair, County Leitrim, and a native of Connacht, Patrick O'Hely joined the Franciscans at an early age. Four years after his profession he was sent to the Spanish University of Alcalá, where he surpassed his contemporaries in sacred studies.

Summoned to Rome, he was promoted in 1576 to the bishopric of Mayo, later merged in the archbishopric of Tuam. Pope Gregory XIII empowered him to officiate in adjoining dioceses, if no Catholic bishop were at hand, and supplied him generously with money. At Paris he took part in public disputations at the Sorbonne university, amazing his hearers by his mastery of patristic and controversial theology, as well as of Scotist philosophy.

In autumn, 1579, he sailed from Brittany and arrived off the coast of Kerry after James Fitzmaurice had landed at Smerwick from Portugal with the remnant of Thomas Stukeley's expedition. All Munster was then in arms. The House of Desmond was divided, and the politic earl had withdrawn from the scene of action. The bishop and his companion, Conn O'Rourke (Irish: Conn Ó Ruairc, born c. 1549), a Franciscan priest, son of Brian, Lord of Breifne, came ashore near Dingle and sought hospitality at the Desmond castle at Askeaton where, in the earl's absence, his countess entertained them. Next day they departed for Limerick; but the countess, probably so instructed, for the earl claimed the merit afterwards, gave information to the Mayor of Limerick, who three days later seized the two ecclesiastics and sent them to Kilmallock, where Lord Justice William Drury then was with an army.

As president of Munster, Drury had taken severe measures, in one year executing four hundred persons "by justice and martial law"; some he sentenced "by natural law, for that he found no law to try them by in the realm". At first he offered to secure Ó hÉilí his see if he would acknowledge the royal supremacy and disclose his business. The bishop replied that he could not barter his faith for life or honours; his business was to do a bishop's part in advancing religion and saving souls. To questions about the plans of the pope and King Philip II of Spain for invading Ireland he made no answer, and thereupon was delivered to torture. As he still remained silent, he and Ó Ruairc were sent to instant execution by martial law.

They were hanged outside one of the gates of Kilmallock on 31 August 1579 and their bodies allowed to remain suspended from the gallows for fourteen days. On 27 September 1992, Pope John Paul II beatified O'Rouke and O'Hely alongside 15 other Irish Catholic Martyrs.

References

External links
Excerpt from Chapters towards a History of Ireland in the reign of Elizabeth

1579 deaths
People of Elizabethan Ireland
People executed under Elizabeth I as Queen of Ireland
People from County Leitrim
Irish Franciscans
Roman Catholic archbishops of Tuam
Irish beatified people
Executed Irish people
People executed by the Kingdom of Ireland by hanging
Victims of anti-Catholic violence in Ireland
16th-century Irish bishops
16th-century Roman Catholic martyrs
16th-century venerated Christians
University of Alcalá alumni
Year of birth unknown
Bishops of Tuam or Killala or of Achonry
Bishops of Mayo